This is a detailed discography for American singer and songwriter Conway Twitty. His late 1950s recordings were in the rockabilly genre, while his subsequent recordings were in a country music style. By the late 1970s, Twitty shifted to a country pop style. He released 58 studio albums during his lifetime.

Studio albums

1950s and 1960s

1970s

1980s

1990s

Compilations

Singles

1950s

1960s

1970s 
{| class="wikitable plainrowheaders sortable" style="text-align:center;"
|-
! rowspan="2"| Year
! rowspan="2" style="width:28em;"| Single
! colspan="5"| Peak chart positions
! rowspan="2"| Certifications
! rowspan="2"| Album
|- style="font-size:smaller;"
! width="45"| US Country
! width="45"| US
! width="45"| CAN Country
! width="45"| CAN
! width="45"| AUS
|-
| rowspan="2"| 1970
! scope="row"| "Hello Darlin'"[A]
| 1
| 60
| 2
| —
| 93
|
 RIAA: Gold
| align="left"| ''Hello Darlin|-
! scope="row"| "Fifteen Years Ago"
| 1
| 81
| 1
| —
| —
|
| align="left"| Fifteen Years Ago
|-
| rowspan="3"| 1971
! scope="row"| "How Much More Can She Stand"
| 1
| 105
| 1
| —
| —
|
| align="left"| How Much More Can She Stand
|-
! scope="row"| "I Wonder What She'll Think About Me Leaving"
| 4
| 112
| 3
| —
| —
|
| align="left"| I Wonder What She'll Think About Me Leaving
|-
! scope="row"| "I Can't See Me Without You"
| 4
| —
| 1
| —
| —
|
| align="left"| I Can't See Me Without You
|-
| rowspan="3"| 1972
! scope="row"| "(Lost Her Love) On Our Last Date"
| 1
| 112
| 1
| —
| —
|
| align="left" rowspan="2"| I Can't Stop Loving You
|-
! scope="row"| "I Can't Stop Loving You"
| 1
| —
| 1
| —
| —
|
|-
! scope="row"| "She Needs Someone to Hold Her (When She Cries)"
| 1
| —
| 8
| —
| —
|
| align="left"| She Needs Someone to Hold Her
|-
| rowspan="2"| 1973
! scope="row"| "Baby's Gone"
| 2
| —
| 2
| —
| —
|
| align="left" rowspan="2"| You've Never Been This Far Before
|-
! scope="row"| "You've Never Been This Far Before"[B]
| 1
| 22
| 1
| 30
| 12
|
|-
| rowspan="3"| 1974
! scope="row"| "There's a Honky Tonk Angel (Who'll Take Me Back In)"
| 1
| —
| 1
| —
| —
|
| align="left"| Honky Tonk Angel
|-
! scope="row"| "I'm Not Through Loving You Yet"
| 3
| —
| 1
| —
| —
|
| align="left" rowspan="2"| I'm Not Through Loving You Yet
|-
! scope="row"| "I See the Want To in Your Eyes"
| 1
| —
| 1
| —
| —
|
|-
| rowspan="4"| 1975
! scope="row"| "Linda on My Mind"
| 1
| 61
| 1
| 51
| —
|
| align="left"| Linda on My Mind
|-
! scope="row"| "Touch the Hand" 
| 1
| —
| 8
| —
| —
|
| align="left" rowspan="2"| The High Priest of Country Music
|-
! scope="row"| "Don't Cry Joni" 
| 4
| 63
| 2
| 94
| —
|
|-
! scope="row"| "This Time I've Hurt Her More Than She Loves Me"
| 1
| —
| 1
| —
| —
|
| align="left"| This Time I've Hurt Her More
|-
| rowspan="3"| 1976
! scope="row"| "After All the Good Is Gone"
| 1
| —
| 1
| —
| —
|
| align="left"| Now and Then
|-
! scope="row"| "The Games That Daddies Play"
| 1
| —
| 1
| —
| —
|
| align="left"| Greatest Hits 2
|-
! scope="row"| "I Can't Believe She Gives It All to Me"
| 1
| —
| 1
| —
| —
|
| align="left" rowspan="2"| Play Guitar Play
|-
| rowspan="3"| 1977
! scope="row"| "Play Guitar Play"
| 1
| —
| 1
| —
| —
|
|-
! scope="row"| "I've Already Loved You in My Mind"
| 1
| —
| 4
| —
| —
|
| align="left"| I've Already Loved You In My Mind
|-
! scope="row"| "Georgia Keeps Pulling on My Ring"
| 3
| —
| 1
| —
| —
|
| align="left" rowspan="2"| Georgia Keeps Pulling on My Ring
|-
| rowspan="3"| 1978
! scope="row"| "The Grandest Lady of Them All"
| 16
| —
| 12
| —
| —
|
|-
! scope="row"| "Boogie Grass Band"
| 2
| —
| 1
| —
| —
|
| align="left" rowspan="2"| Conway
|-
! scope="row"| "Your Love Had Taken Me That High"
| 3
| —
| 1
| —
| —
|
|-
| rowspan="3"| 1979
! scope="row"| "Don't Take It Away"
| 1
| —
| 1
| —
| —
|
| align="left" rowspan="3"| Cross Winds
|-
! scope="row"| "I May Never Get to Heaven"
| 1
| —
| 1
| —
| —
|
|-
! scope="row"| "Happy Birthday Darlin'"
| 1
| —
| 13
| —
| —
|
|-
| colspan="9" style="font-size:8pt"| "—" denotes releases that did not chart
|-
|}

 1980s 

 1990s 

Other singles

 Charted B-sides 

Guest singles

 Promotional singles 

Music videos

See also
Conway Twitty and Loretta Lynn discography

Notes

A^ "Hello Darlin'" was certified gold by the Recording Industry Association of America.
B^ "You've Never Been This Far Before" also peaked at number 37 on the U.S. Billboard Hot Adult Contemporary Tracks chart and number 21 on the Canadian RPM Adult Contemporary Tracks chart.
C^''' Twitty's vocal on "(I Wanna Hear) A Cheatin' Song" was spliced together from previously recorded performances.

References

Country music discographies
 
 
Discographies of American artists
Rock music discographies